Vania King and Barbora Záhlavová-Strýcová were the defending champions, but King decided not to participate this year.

Záhlavová-Strýcová partnered with Bethanie Mattek-Sands, but lost to Sofia Arvidsson and Johanna Larsson 6–1, 2–6, [10–6] in the final.

Seeds

Draw

References
Main Draw

Challenge Bell
Tournoi de Québec
Can